Tubeless tires (also spelled as tubeless tyres in Commonwealth English) are pneumatic tires that do not require a separate inner tube. 

Unlike pneumatic tires which use a separate inner tube, tubeless tires have continuous ribs molded integrally into the bead of the tire so that they are forced by the pressure of the air inside the tire to seal with the flanges of the metal rim of the wheel.

History
Many patents had been filed covering tubeless tires. Killen Tire applied for a patent in 1928 and was granted  in the UK in 1930. The Wingfoot Corporation, a subsidiary of Goodyear Tire were granted a patent in South Africa in 1944. Due to technical problems, most of these designs saw only limited production or were abandoned.

Frank Herzegh working for BF Goodrich applied for a patent in 1946 and eventually received  in 1952 in the United States. By 1955 tubeless tires became standard equipment on new cars. BF Goodrich had to defend their patent in court several times, due to the similarities of previous designs. The primary difference between the BF Goodrich design and their predecessors was the usage of butyl rubber, which was more resistant to air leakage than the natural rubber used in the other designs.

Safety
Traditional designs of pneumatic tyres required a separate inner tube which could fail for a number of reasons, such as incorrect tyre fit, friction between the tyre wall and inner tube generating excess heat, or a puncture. Tubeless tyre technology does away with the need for an inner tube thereby increasing safety. In a tubeless tyre, the tyre and the rim of the wheel form an airtight seal, with the valve being directly mounted on the rim. If a tubeless tyre gets a small puncture, air escapes only through the hole, leading to a gentle deflation. Conversely, a tubed tire, with an inner tube, could burst like a balloon, leading to deflation of the tire which could result in sudden loss of control of the vehicle. However, the "bursting like a balloon" scenario is highly unlikely due to fact that the inner tube is inside of the tire and will deflate at a rate proportional to the puncture hole size. In antique automobiles, made before the mid 1950s, the rims are not designed for tubeless tyres, and an inner tube is required to prevent slow leaks at the bead.

Tire sealants
Liquid tire sealant can be injected into tubeless tires to prevent deflation in case of small punctures, although there is controversy regarding its compatibility with direct tire pressure monitoring systems (TPMS) that employ sensors mounted inside the tire.  Some manufacturers of sealants assert that their products are indeed compatible,  but others warned that, e.g., the "sealant may come in contact with the sensor in a way that renders the sensor TEMPORARILY inoperable until it is properly cleaned, inspected and re-installed by a tire care professional".  Such doubts are also reported by others.  Use of such sealants may void the TPMS sensor warranty.

Bicycle tires

A tubeless bicycle tire system requires a compatible tire, an airtight rim—capable of being sealed at the valve stem, spoke holes (if they go all the way through the rim) and the tire bead seat.  Liquid sealant is added inside the tire to prevent leaking around the bead and to seal holes from small punctures.

The main benefit of tubeless tires is the ability to use low air pressure for better traction without getting pinch flats because there is no tube to pinch between the rim and an obstacle. Lower pressures mean improved comfort and rolling performance on rough surfaces. Since there’s no inner tube, there’s no friction between tyre and tube. Many punctures will self seal. Most punctures that don’t seal are easy to fix with a  tyre plug.

Mountain and Gravel
UST or Universal System Tubeless is a  rim designed by Mavic with hooked edges designed to seal with specially designed tires. Several companies such as Michelin and Hutchinson make tires compatible with UST rims. UST was the first tubeless system for bicycles. Other companies such as Stan’s NoTubes, Bontrager, DT Swiss, and WTB have their own similar system called Tubeless Ready.

Road
In 2006, Shimano and Hutchinson introduced a tubeless system for road bicycles. Tubeless tires have not yet gained popular acceptance in road racing due to lack of sponsorship, the tradition of using tubular tires and the fact that, even without the innertube, the combined weight of tubeless rims and tires is more than top-of-the-line tubular tire wheelsets. Road tubeless is gaining popularity among riders for whom the benefits are worth the costs.

See also 
 
 Dunlop valve
 Inflation pressure
 Bar
 kPa
 PSI or psi
 Outline of tires
 Presta valve
 Rolling resistance
 Schrader valve

References

External links 

 

Tires